Manuel "Mani" Hernandez (born August 2, 1948 in Madrid, Spain) is a Spanish-American former soccer forward.  He played collegiate soccer at San Jose State University where he won the 1968 Hermann Trophy as the collegiate player of the year.  He later spent three seasons with the San Jose Earthquakes of the North American Soccer League.  He currently coaches high school girls soccer at Presentation High School.

Player

Youth and college
Hernandez was born in Spain where he spent most of his youth.  He joined Atletico Madrid soccer club as a youth player, but his life took a turn when tragedy struck.  After the death of both of his parents, Hernandez left Spain to live with his uncle in the United States.  He arrived in the U.S. as a junior in high school. Hernandez played youth u17 and u18 in Hayward, California. His senior year, San Jose State soccer coach Jules Menendez approached Hernandez about playing for him.  Hernandez agreed and Menendez became a second father to him.  In 1968, the Spartans went to the NCAA Final Four before falling to eventual co-champions Maryland.  That year, Hernandez was selected as a first team All American and the 1968 Hermann Trophy recipient as the top collegiate player of the year.

Club career
Following college, Hernandez spent several years with San Francisco semi-pro teams.  In 1974, the North American Soccer League (NASL) established a franchise in San Jose, naming it the San Jose Earthquakes.  The Earthquakes signed Hernandez.   On 5 May 1974, Hernandez scored the first ever point for a San Jose professional sports franchise when he scored against the Vancouver Whitecaps seven minutes into the match.  He spent three season with the ‘Quakes, 1974-1976.  In 1979, he signed with the Detroit Lightning of the Major Indoor Soccer League.  After one season, he moved to the San Francisco Fog.

Olympics and national teams
In 1970, Hernandez represented the united States Olympic Team at the Pan-American games, Hernandez scored two goals against Bermuda which allow them to go into the second round of competition for the first time in the history of the tournament.
In 1972, Hernandez was selected for the U.S. Olympic Team as it began the qualification process for the 1972 Summer Olympics.  Hernandez scored one of the two goals in the U.S. victory over Jamaica which put the U.S. into the tournament.  Hernandez earned two caps with the U.S. national team in 1974, both losses to Mexico.

Coach
In 1976, Hernandez coached Leland High School (San Jose, CA) varsity men's soccer team to its first Central Coast Section championship and in 1982, Hernandez was also the assistant coach at San Jose State men's soccer. Hernandez coached the Gunderson High School (San Jose, CA) varsity men's soccer team to its first Central Coast Section playoff berth, beating previous Central Coastal Sectional champion Watsonville HS 11-1 in a 1st-round match.  In 1983, Presentation High School in San Jose hired Hernandez, becoming the head coach of the girl’s varsity soccer team.  Over the decades since then, he has taken Presentation to seventeen league championships and eight Central Coast Sectional titles.  Aly Wagner and Danielle Slaton are among the players Hernandez has coached at Presentation.

References

External links
 Profile of Hernandez at Presentation High School
 NASL/MISL Stats

1948 births
Living people
American soccer coaches
American soccer players
Detroit Lightning players
Footballers at the 1972 Summer Olympics
Hermann Trophy men's winners
Major Indoor Soccer League (1978–1992) players
North American Soccer League (1968–1984) players
North American Soccer League (1968–1984) indoor players
Footballers at the 1971 Pan American Games
Pan American Games competitors for the United States
Olympic soccer players of the United States
San Francisco Fog (MISL) players
San Jose Earthquakes (1974–1988) players
San Jose State University alumni
Spanish emigrants to the United States
Footballers from Madrid
United States men's international soccer players
San Jose State Spartans men's soccer players
Association football forwards
High school soccer coaches in the United States
San Jose State Spartans men's soccer coaches